Perur  is a village in the Srirangam taluk of Tiruchirappalli district in Tamil Nadu, India.

Demographics 

As per the 2001 census, Perur had a population of 1,049 with 528 males and 521 females. The sex ratio was 987 and the literacy rate, 76.97.

References 

 

Villages in Tiruchirappalli district